Livingston Manor is a hamlet (and a census-designated place) in Sullivan County, New York, United States. The population was 1,221 at the 2010 census.

Livingston Manor is located in the southern part of the town of Rockland. New York State Route 17 runs by it.

History

In the late 19th century, this community renamed itself as Livingston Manor, after descendants of the prominent Livingston family who had a house there. In the early 18th century, the original manor was the site of work camps along the Hudson, where Palatine German refugees worked off their passage to New York paid by the Crown. They produced timber and supplies for the English navy. Later they were allowed to settle in the Schoharie and Mohawk valleys.

The Sullivan County community was part of the Hardenbergh patent in 1716, which included much of the Catskill Mountains.

In 1750, Robert Livingston bought  in this area, shortly after becoming the third (and final) Lord of the Manor of Livingston Manor. He sold or leased most of the land by 1780. Robert's third son, John Robert Livingston (1775–1851), deeded  to his nephew, Dr. Edward R. Livingston, in 1822 around the area then called Purvis, New York. Edward Livingston died in 1864.

In 1880, the New York, Ontario and Western Railway reached Livingston Manor. Many of its premier trains, such as the Livingston Manor Express, ended there. Passenger service ended in early September, 1953, and the railroad was abandoned on March 30, 1957. 

Purvis residents in 1882 chose the new name of Livingston Manor. Edward Livingston's residence, according to a sign in the village, was on a site now occupied by the village firehouse. Another town source says that it was on a site later developed as the Rockland, New York Town Hall.

In the 1930s, a Livingston descendant arrived in Livingston Manor claiming title to his ancestral land, which had previously been held by tenants under lease. He won his case in court. The people whose ancestors had been tenants had to purchase the property they had been living on for years.

Other early settlers were the Benton family. Their immigrant ancestors had come from Essex, England, in the mid-17th century, settling in Guilford, Connecticut. Records show some of their descendants migrated to in Sullivan County in the late 18th century from Connecticut, purchasing a large tract of land in what is now known as the Township of Liberty. They were likely Scots-Irish in ancestry. They took on many jobs in Sullivan County. Other families who acquired land and settled in the surrounding area were the Bascoms, Stewarts, Wests, Harringtons, Williams, Cochrans, Motts, Kimballs, Darbees, Woodards, Barnharts, and Joselyns.  Some descendants of these families still reside in the area.

In the late 19th and early 20th centuries, the village attracted immigrants from eastern Europe. Ashkenazy Jewish immigrants founded the Agudas Achim Synagogue. It was listed on the National Register of Historic Places in 1998.

Fly fishing in the United States
The area claims to be the "birthplace of fly-fishing in the United States" largely because of trout fishing on the -long Willowemoc Creek. It flows between the village and Roscoe, where it intersects the Beaver Kill. The Catskill Fly Fishing Center and Museum is on the northern edge of the town on the Willowemoc Creek.

Today fish stocks in the Catskills are managed by state wildlife agents. All of the stocked fish (1 million pounds each year) for the Catskills, as well all the reservoirs in the New York City water supply, are bred at the Catskill Fish Hatchery just northeast of Livingston Manor in DeBruce, New York.

Since 2004, the community has sponsored an annual Trout Parade (organized by the Catskill Art Society and the Chamber of Commerce). It has been compared to the Mermaid Parade.

Education
Livingston Manor Central School District manages the public schools in the township. They consist of Livingston Manor Central School (middle and high school) and Livingston Manor Elementary School. Livingston Manor's Varsity softball team won the Class D Section 9 State title in 2010 and 2011. The Boys Varsity baseball team won the Class D Section 9 State title in 2011.

Geography

Livingston Manor is located at  (41.896061, -74.827348).

Downtown
The downtown of Livingston Manor, mostly along Main Street, has several restaurants, a large grocery store, several art and antique shops. It is the scene of an annual "trout parade" in June that draws marching bands, fire trucks and other local amusements. The Catskill Art Society runs a non-profit multi-arts venue on Main Street, the CAS Arts Center, which offers exhibits on view in their galleries and fine arts classes to the community.

Flood problems
Numerous times in recent history, heavy rain storms significantly increased the flow of the Willowemoc Creek causing flooding of main street and other low lying areas of the hamlet.

Demographics

As of the census of 2000, there were 1,355 people, 515 households, and 330 families residing in the CDP. The population density was 437.6 per square mile (168.8/km2). There were 619 housing units at an average density of 199.9/mi2 (77.1/km2). The racial makeup of the CDP was 85.39% White, 6.20% African American, 0.15% Native American, 0.96% Asian, 5.09% from other races, and 2.21% from two or more races. Hispanic or Latino of any race were 11.81% of the population.

There were 515 households, out of which 33.8% had children under the age of 18 living with them, 41.4% were married couples living together, 16.1% had a female householder with no husband present, and 35.9% were non-families. 28.5% of all households were made up of individuals, and 11.8% had someone living alone who was 65 years of age or older. The average household size was 2.62 and the average family size was 3.21.

In the CDP, the population was spread out, with 31.8% under the age of 18, 7.4% from 18 to 24, 26.0% from 25 to 44, 21.7% from 45 to 64, and 13.1% who were 65 years of age or older. The median age was 35 years. For every 100 females, there were 94.1 males. For every 100 females age 18 and over, there were 90.5 males.

The median income for a household in the CDP was $27,159, and the median income for a family was $29,167. Males had a median income of $22,250 versus $24,375 for females. The per capita income for the CDP was $13,047. About 22.0% of families and 26.1% of the population were below the poverty line, including 41.6% of those under age 18 and 10.0% of those age 65 or over.

Livingston Manor has an excellent Volunteer Fire Department and Volunteer Basic Life Support Ambulance Corps.

Notable people
Irving Berlin owned a 50-acre farm located in the nearby hamlet of Lew Beach, NY.
Sam Morrison, jazz saxophonist and flutist
John Mott, winner of the 1946 Nobel Peace Prize, born in Livingston Manor
 Joan Wulff
 Lee Wulff

Houses of worship
Methodist Church
Presbyterian Church
Cornerstone Community Church (Grooville Free Methodist)
Main Street Bible Fellowship
Saint Aloysius Catholic Church /De Bruce branch of Catholic Church open in summer.
Agudas Achim Synagogue
Our Lady of Lourdes Monastery
Willowemoc Baptist Church
Lew Beach Community Church

References

External links

Livingston Manor, New York
Catskill Art Society - CAS Arts Center
Life Repurposed
The Catskill Brewery
Willow and Brown
Brandenburg Bakery
Mountain Bear Crafts
The Delightful Place
Bryan Cronk Ceramics
Sugar Blossom Flowers
Catskill Fly Fishing Center & Museum
Livingston Manor Free Library
Livingston Manor Central School
Town of Rockland
Livingston Manor Renaissance
Shandelee Music Festival
The Arnold House
The DeBruce
Madison's Restaurant & Main Street Stand
Morgan Outdoors
The Beaverkill Valley Inn
Nest
Upstream Wine & Spirits
Main Street Farm Market & Cafe
StillZinsel A Frame Shop
Sunshine Colony

Census-designated places in New York (state)
Hamlets in New York (state)
Census-designated places in Sullivan County, New York
Hamlets in Sullivan County, New York
1750 establishments in the Province of New York